Union des Transports Africains de Guinée was a Guinean and Lebanese regional airline. It operated for only three years, and shut down operations after the passenger and cargo mismanagement that caused its Flight 141 to become overloaded, preventing it from properly taking off and causing it to crash into the sea .

Accidents and incidents
 UTA Flight 141 was a regularly scheduled flight from Benin to Lebanon. On Christmas 2003, it crashed into the Bight of Benin due to imbalanced cargo and an excess of passengers. 141 people died and 22 survived.

See also		
 List of defunct airlines of Guinea
 Transport in Guinea

References

External links
Union des Transports Africains de Guinée at the Aviation Safety Network Database

Defunct airlines of Guinea